This is a list of universities in Syria including public, private, military and police institutions.

Public universities and colleges
As of 2018, there are 8 public universities, 1 colleges, 1 virtual university, in addition to 6 higher institutes in Syria, owned by the government.

Branches of foreign public universities
As of 2018, Syria has 2 branches of foreign public universities.

Private universities 
As of 2018, there are 21 private universities in Syria.

Military
As of 2018, there are 16 high military educational institutions in Syria run by the Ministry of Defense of Syria.

Police
As of 2018, there is 1 high educational institutions for police sciences in Syria run by the Syrian Ministry of Interior.

Notes

References

Universities
Syria
Syria